Markíza Doma ("Doma" means "At home" in Slovak) is the first television channel aimed at young, active people in Slovakia. The channel, which launched on 31 August 2009, is owned by Central European Media Enterprises (through PPF) and currently has a reach of approximately 95% of the country's 5.4 million people and broadcasts 24 hours per day.

Television Doma showcases top foreign series, soap-operas, shows and movies targeted at young female viewers. This includes CME's own regionally produced programs, highly rated European series, the most popular and newest Latin American, Turkish and Indian soap-operas, infotainment shows and lifestyle programs, romantic themed Fridays & Saturdays with romantic movies made by novels by Rosamunde Pilcher, Inga Lindström, Lilly Schönauer, Danielle Steel, Emilie Richards, Barbara Wood, Utta Danella, Charlotte Link, Robin Pilcher, Katie Fforde, Dora Heldt and Harlequin movies, as well as a la mode Sundays with American or European movies.

From 31 March 2012 TV Doma has changed its graphic layout, ident and logo to be more suitable not only for young women but for the entire household as a result of strengthening its position on the market. Also its slogan has changed from "At Home Is The Love!" to "At Home Is The Relax!". TV Doma has started to be characterized as feel good television.

In May 2012, the HD version of the channel has launched and it is distributed in Cable and IPTV platforms.

The channel is extending its programming including highly rated foreign titles as well as gradually delivered locally produced content relevant to its audience.

Original programming
The first locally produced content was a daily lifestyle talk show L.O.V.E. It started in April 2010 in late prime time and from September 2010 it was moved to fringe time. Also the weekly gossip news called Up on the Roof was moved there from TV Markíza taking the slot on Friday evening. However, both shows were canceled in December 2010 due to the austerity measures.

The preparation of the first Slovak locally produced soap opera called Only Love which is based on CME's Romanian soap opera Numai Iubirea has started in early 2010. During the preparation, the management decided to change the plot to be more suitable for mainstream viewers and to air the new series on TV Markíza under the name Second Wind. However, in December 2011 it has been revealed that the new romance TV series of 80 episodes will be finally broadcast on TV Doma to strengthen its position on the market. Broadcast of the series started on 2 January 2012 taking the slot on 9 pm. In April 2012 it has been revealed that due to the big success of the series, the new original plot for the second season of 64 episodes has been written by Slovak screenwriters. Broadcast of the second season started on 17 September 2012 taking the slot on 8 p.m. and concluded on 18 January 2013.

Telenovelas

Other telenovelas

CME's regionally produced programs

Airing currently
Rose Garden Medical Clinic (all seasons)

Coming soon
Come Dine with Me Slovakia
Private Matters (all movies)

Ended
Between Friends
Come Date with Me Slovakia
Doctors
Four Weddings Slovakia
Girlfriends (all series)
Hot Blood (all seasons)
Hurricane
Insuring Happiness (season 3–5)
Our Street (season 3)
Perfect Day
Perfect World
Talentmania
Wife Swap Slovakia

TV series

Airing currently
Elementary
Friends
T@gged
Light as a Feather
Rizzoli & Isles
The Middle

Coming soon
2 Broke Girls (all seasons)
90210 (all seasons)
Dallas (all seasons)
Hellcats
Houdini & Doyle
Outlander (season 1–3)
Pretty Little Liars (all seasons)
Shameless (season 1–6)
The Secret Circle

Ended
'Til Death (all seasons)
3 lbs.
666 Park Avenue
7th Heaven (season 1–5)
Alice Nevers (season 1–3)
Ally McBeal (all seasons)
Ask Harriet
Beauty & the Beast (season 1)
Better with You
Close to Home (season 2)
Cold Case (all seasons)
Courting Alex
Criminal Minds (season 3)
Dharma & Greg (all seasons)
Drop Dead Diva (season 1–5)
Early Edition (all seasons)
Eastwick
Élodie Bradford  (season 1–2)
ER (season 14–15)
Forever
Frasier (all seasons)
Gilmore Girls (all seasons)
Gossip Girl (all seasons)
H2O: Just Add Water (season 1)
Hart of Dixie (all seasons)
Hawthorne (all seasons)
House (all seasons)
Charmed (season 1–6)
Jesse (all seasons)
Jo
Joan of Arcadia (all seasons)
LAX
Lost Girl (all seasons)
Love, Inc.
Major Crimes (season 1–2)
Made in Jersey
Married... with Children (season 1–6)
Melrose Place
Men in Trees (all seasons)
Mercy
Miami Medical
Mike & Molly (season 1–5)
Missing (all seasons)
Monk (all seasons)
NCIS (season 5)
Necessary Roughness (all seasons)
Nurse Jackie (all seasons)
Pasadena
Privileged
Pushing Daisies (all seasons)
Roseanne (season 6–9)
Royal Pains (season 1–6)
Sabrina, the Teenage Witch (all seasons)
Sea of Souls (all seasons)
Seafarers (all seasons)
Seinfeld (season 1–4)
Sex and the City (all seasons)
Step by Step (all seasons)
Suburgatory (season 1–2)
Suddenly Susan (all seasons)
Sue Thomas: F.B.Eye (all seasons)
Summerland (all seasons)
Suspected
The Captain (season 2)
The Client List (all seasons)
The Guardian (season 1–2)
The Mentalist (all seasons)
The Millers (all seasons)
The Mysteries of Laura (all season)
The Mob Doctor
The Nanny (all seasons)
The Prince and the Maiden (season 3)
The O.C. (season 1–3)
The Tudors (all seasons)
The Vampire Diaries (season 3–5)
The Whole Truth
Undercovers
Unforgettable (all seasons)
Veterinarian Dr. Mertens (all seasons)
Veronica Mars (all seasons)
Veronica's Closet (all seasons)
Without a Trace (season 1–4)
Yes, Dear (season 1–2)

Movie series and miniseries
Angélique
Anne of Green Gables
Avignon Prophecy
Columbo (all movies)
Cruise to Happiness
Daughter of Elisa: Return to Rivombrosa
Desert of Fire
Dream Hotel
Elisa of Rivombrosa (all seasons)
Fantaghirò
Harlequin
In The Valley of Wild Roses
Laura: The Countdown Has Begun
Love, Babies and the Great Heart
McBride
Mountain of Diamonds
Mystery Woman
Our Farm in Ireland
Sissi Trilogy
Sissi: The True Story of Her Love
The Alpin Clinic
The Dream Ship
The Holiday Doctor
The Seventh Scroll
The Thorn Birds
The Thorn Birds: The Missing Years
Zodiak: The Horoscope Killer

TV shows

Airing currently

Coming soon

Ended
16 and Pregnant (season 1–5)
Baby It's You/A Baby's World
Extreme Christmas Trees
Extreme Makeover: Weight Loss Edition (all seasons)
Fly Girls
It's Me or the Dog (season 1–3)
Judge Hatchett (all seasons)
Planet Cake
So You Think You Can Dance (season 8)
Supernanny
Teen Mom (all seasons)
The Dr. Oz Show (season 1–2)
The Naked Chef (all seasons)
The Nate Berkus Show (season 1)
The Voice U.S. (season 3)
Victoria's Secret Fashion Show (2010, 2011)
Wedding Belles
What Not To Wear UK (all seasons)

References

External links

TV Doma at LyngSat Address
Program TV Doma

Mass media in Slovakia
Television channels in Slovakia
Central European Media Enterprises
Television channels and stations established in 2009